Marshal Choe Kwang (July 17, 1918 – February 21, 1997) was a prominent military leader in North Korea.

Biography
He graduated from the Soviet Military School and served as captain in the Northeast Anti-Japanese Army until the end of the Japanese occupation. In February 1948, he took office as the 1st Division Commander of the Korean People's Army. In September 1948, he was elected to the Supreme People's Assembly. In June 1950, the 13th Division Commander of the Chosun People's Army and in October 1952, Kang Kun-Gun School (currently Kang-Gun General School) was inaugurated. In October 1953, he became the commander of the 5th Corps of the Chosun People's Army, and in January 1954, he was promoted to Lieutenant General of the Chosun People's Army and became the Chief of Staff of the 1st Corps.

In April 1956, he was elected as a candidate for the Central Committee of the Party at the 3rd Party Congress of the Workers' Party of Korea. In June 1958, he became the commander of the Air Force, and in June 1960, he was promoted to the Korean People's Army. In September 1961, he was elected as the central member of the party at the 4th Party Congress. In September 1962 he became vice of the National Security Agency (Abolished in 1972 and reorganized into the Ministry of People's Armed Forces). In February 1963, he was promoted to Captain of the Korean People's Army and became the Chief of General of Staff. On October 2, 1966, he was elected as a candidate for the Political Committee of the Party at the 2nd Party Delegates' Meeting, and in December 1967 he was elected to the Standing Committee of the Supreme People's Assembly. However, in March 1969, he was dismissed and became a mining worker.

In April 1976, he was reinstated while taking office as chairman of the People's Committee of the South Hwanghae Province. At the 6th Party Congress in October 1980, he was elected to the Central Committee of the WPK and the candidate member of the Political Bureau. In March 1981, he became Deputy Prime Minister Jung Moo-won. In April 1982, Jung Moo-won was inaugurated as Deputy Prime Minister and Chairman of the Fisheries Committee. On February 12, 1988, he withdrew from the deputy prime minister and transferred to the military. He was inaugurated as the Chief of the General Staff of the Korean People's Army and a member of the Central Military Commission of the Workers' Party of Korea.

On May 23, 1990, he was elected a member of the Party's Political Bureau at the 18th Plenary Session of the 6th Party Central Committee, and took office as Vice-President of the National Defence Commission . In 1991, he was elected as a member of the Party's Central Military Committee, and on April 20, 1992, he was granted the title of Deputy General of the Korean People's Army. On October 8, 1995, he was appointed Minister of the People's Armed Forces. and was awarded the rank of Marshal of the Korean People's Army.

He was one of three military officers in the North Korean Armed Forces who reached rank of Wonsu (Marshal) with the title "Marshal of the Korean People's Army".

Death and funeral
Choe died of a heart attack on February 21, 1997. On his funeral committee were:

 Kim Jong-il
 Ri Jong-ok
 Pak Song-chol
 Kim Yong-ju
 Kim Yong-nam
 Ri Ul-sol
 Jo Myong-rok
 Kim Yong-chun
 Kye Ung-thae
 Chon Pyong-ho
 Han Song-ryong
 Kim Chol-man
 Choe Thae-bok
 Yang Hyong-sop
 Chon Un-sop
 Hong Song-nam
 Hong Sok-hyong
 Kim Kuk-thae
 Kim Ki-nam
 Kim Jung-rin
 Kim Yong-sun
 Yun Ki-bok
 Kim Kwang-chin
 Paek Hak-rim
 Kim Ik-hyon
 Ri Tu-ik
 Choe In-tok
 Hwang Sun-hui
 Choe Song-suk
 Kim Yong-yon
 Ri Jong-san
 Kim Jong-kak
 O Ryong-pang
 Ri Pyong-uk
 Jong Chang-ryol
 Ri Yong-su
 Kim Ha-kyu
 Hyon Chol-hae
 Won Ung-hui
 Pak Jae-kyong
 Ri Myong-su
 Kim Tae-sik
 Ok Pong-ran
 Kim Myong-kuk
 Kim Kyok-sik
 Chang Song-u
 Chon Chin-su
 Ju Sang-song
 Kim Il-chol
 Kang Tong-yon
 Pak Ki-song
 Ri Yong-chol
 Kim Yong-un
 Chon Jae-son
 Yo Chun-sok
 Kim Song-kyu
 Jong Ho-kyun
 Paek Sang-ho
 Ri Thaek-chol
 O Kum-chol
 Ri Yong-hwan
 Kim Hyong-ryong
 Chon Chi-ryon
 Choe Sang-ryo
 Ri Pyong-sam
 Chi Yong-jun
 Kim Ki-son
 Pak Sung-won
 An Pi-tuk
 Ri Pong-ju
 Kim Sung-yon
 Ri Chang-han
 Jong Thae-kun
 Yom Chol-song
 Pyon Sang-mo
 Kim Mun-hong
 Ri Chu-ul
 Han Tae-myon
 Son Chol-ju
 Kim Sang-thae
 Choe Ho-jun
 Tong Yong-il
 Kim Ki-nam
 Paek Bo-kyong
 Kim Tu-nam

References

|-

|-

|-

|-

|-

|-

1918 births
1997 deaths
North Korean military personnel
Defence ministers of North Korea
North Korean military personnel of the Korean War
Members of the 6th Politburo of the Workers' Party of Korea
Alternate members of the 6th Politburo of the Workers' Party of Korea
Members of the 5th Central Committee of the Workers' Party of Korea
Members of the 6th Central Committee of the Workers' Party of Korea
Members of the 1st Supreme People's Assembly
Members of the 2nd Supreme People's Assembly
Members of the 3rd Supreme People's Assembly
Members of the 4th Supreme People's Assembly
Members of the 5th Supreme People's Assembly
Members of the 6th Supreme People's Assembly
Members of the 7th Supreme People's Assembly
Members of the 8th Supreme People's Assembly
Members of the 9th Supreme People's Assembly
People from North Hamgyong
People of 88th Separate Rifle Brigade